The 2005 Ford 400 was a NASCAR Nextel Cup Series race held on November 20, 2005, at Homestead Miami Speedway in Homestead, Florida. Contested over 267 laps on the 1.5 miles (2.4 km) speedway, it was the 36th and final race of the 2005 NASCAR Nextel Cup Series season. Greg Biffle of Roush Racing won the race and Tony Stewart of Joe Gibbs Racing won the championship.

Background
Homestead-Miami Speedway is a motor racing track located in Homestead, Florida. The track, which has several configurations, has promoted several series of racing, including NASCAR, the Verizon IndyCar Series, the Grand-Am Rolex Sports Car Series, and the Championship Cup Series.

Since 2002, Homestead-Miami Speedway has hosted the final race of the season in all three of NASCAR's series: the Sprint Cup Series, Xfinity Series, and the Camping World Truck Series. Ford Motor Company sponsors all three of the season-ending races; the races have the names Ford 400, Ford 300, and Ford 200, respectively, and the weekend is marketed as Ford Championship Weekend.

Entry list

Qualifying 
Carl Edwards would win the pole with a 30.673, beating out Ryan Newman by 2 thousandths of a second. 

There were numerous qualifying crashes throughout the day. The first would occur when during Carl Long's qualifying run, Long's car would get loose heading into Turn 1, causing his car to go into a tailspin. The car went up the track and eventually, the rear of the car hit the middle of the Turn 1-2 wall, severely damaging his car. Long would not get a qualifying time, and since the 80 car, owned by Hover Motorsports was not top 35 in owner's points, did not get a provisional and thus Long would not qualify. Morgan Shepherd would also suffer a spin on his warmup lap. Shepherd would pull into pit road, with his team scrambling to get back out on track. His car was not able to get out within the 5 minute clock Shepherd was forced to qualify in, classifying Shepherd as a Did Not Start (DNS). Shepherd would not qualify. The third accident of the day was when Michael Waltrip suffered a similar crash to Carl Long earlier in the day, totaling Waltrip's car. The rear of the car was extremely damaged, forcing Waltrip to take a provisional and to be in a backup car. The last accident of the day happened when Hamlin also entered into a tailspin and hit the Turn 1 wall, ironically with the crash being the same as both Long's and Waltrip's crashes. Although Hamlin had only competed in very select races that year, the No. 11 team was Top 35 in the points that year. Hamlin would take a provisional and start 42nd. Eerily, Hamlin's crash was about the same as the one as he had suffered in the Busch Series race he was qualifying for.

Race
Greg Biffle won the race and leading Roush Racing 1–2–3–4 finish, a feat not repeated until the 2021 Drydene 400 at Dover when Hendrick Motorsports did it. Meanwhile, Carl Edwards, Greg Biffle, Tony Stewart, and Jimmie Johnson each had a mathematical chance to win the championship. However, Johnson crashed out at Lap 127 with a blown tire in Turn Three. Despite the fact that Edwards and Biffle finished upfront while Stewart finished 15th, Stewart still won the championship. The race was also the last for Rusty Wallace as he retired afterward, having competed in NASCAR Cup racing for 25 years.

Race results

Race statistics
 Time of race: 3:02:50
 Average Speed: 
 Pole Speed: 
 Cautions: 8 for 37 laps
 Margin of Victory: 0.017
 Lead changes: 21
 Percent of race run under caution: 13.9%         
 Average green flag run: 25.6 laps

References

Ford 400
Ford 400
NASCAR races at Homestead-Miami Speedway